Supermarket is a studio album by the Israeli rock band, Rockfour. Released in September 2000, Supermarket is the band's first English album.

Track listing

Personnel 
 Eli LuLai – acoustic guitar, vocals
 Marc Lazare – bass guitar
 Baruch Ben Yitzhak – guitar, mellotron
 Issar Tennenbaum – drums, percussion
 Noam Rapaport – mellotron, piano
 Eldad Guata – keyboard
 Eli Hayun – producer

Rockfour albums
2000 albums